Costin is both a Romanian and English surname and a given name. Notable people with the name include:

Surname:
Alexandru Costin (born 1991), Moldovan footballer
Brandon Costin, Australian rugby league player
Darren Costin (born 1966), English musician
Doug Costin (born 1997), American football player
Frank Costin (1920–1995), British automotive engineer
Gheorghe Costin (born 1955), Romanian conductor and composer
Henry Gilbert Costin (1898–1918), United States Army soldier and Medal of Honor recipient
Ion Costin (1887–1940), Moldovan politician
Jamie Costin (born 1977), Irish racewalker
Mike Costin, British automotive engineer
Miron Costin (1633–1691), Moldavian chronicler
Nicolae Costin (1936–1995), Moldovan politician
Nicolae Costin (chronicler) (1660–1712), Moldavian chronicler
Raul Costin (born 1985), Romanian footballer
Robert Costin, British classical organist, teacher and conductor
Sergiu Costin (born 1978), Romanian footballer
Thomas P. Costin Jr. (born 1926), American politician
William Costin (born 1780), early American civil rights activist in Washington, D.C.

Given name:
Costin Curelea (born 1984), Romanian footballer
Costin Gheorghe (born 1989), Romanian footballer
Costin Lazăr (born 1981), Romanian footballer
Costin Miereanu (born 1943), Romanian-born French composer and musicologist
Costin Nenițescu (1902–1970), Romanian chemist
Costin Petrescu (musician) (born 1949), Romanian rock musician
Costin Petrescu (painter) (1872–1954), Romanian painter

English-language surnames
Romanian-language surnames
Romanian masculine given names